William Oliver Swofford (February 22, 1945 – February 12, 2000), known professionally as Oliver, was an American pop singer, best known for his 1969 song "Good Morning Starshine" from the musical Hair as well as "Jean" (the theme from the film The Prime of Miss Jean Brodie).

Career
William Oliver Swofford was born on February 22, 1945, in North Wilkesboro, North Carolina, to Jack and Helen Swofford. He attended the University of North Carolina at Chapel Hill starting in 1963 and began singing as an undergraduate. He was a member of two popular music groups — The Virginians and, later, The Good Earth — and was then known as Bill Swofford.

His uptempo single "Good Morning Starshine" from the pop/rock musical Hair reached No. 3 on the Billboard Hot 100 in July 1969, sold over one million copies, and was awarded a gold disc by the R.I.A.A. a month later. Later that fall, a softer, ballad single titled "Jean" (the theme from the Oscar-winning film The Prime of Miss Jean Brodie) reached No. 2 on the Hot 100 and No. 1 on the Billboard Easy Listening chart. Written by poet Rod McKuen, "Jean" also sold over one million copies, garnering Oliver his second gold disc in as many months. Performing both hits on a number of television variety shows and specials in the late 1960s, including The Ed Sullivan Show, helped both songs.

Oliver had more modest commercial success with the cover of "Sunday Mornin'", which peaked at No. 35 in December 1969, and "Angelica", which stalled at No. 97 four months later. His cover of "I Can Remember", the 1968 James & Bobby Purify hit, missed the Hot 100 but climbed into the top 25 of the Billboard Easy Listening chart in the mid summer of 1970. Late that fall, Oliver also had one inspirational recording titled "Light the Way", composed by Eric Carmen. Oliver's last single to enter the pop music charts was his 1971 cover of "Early Morning Rain" by Canadian singer-songwriter Gordon Lightfoot. The song "Bubbled Under" at No. 124 on May 1, 1971 and also reached No. 38 on the Easy Listening chart a few weeks later.

As producer Bob Crewe preferred elaborately orchestrated musical arrangements and Oliver preferred a simpler folk sound, these "creative differences" led them to part ways in 1971. Resuming the name Bill "Oliver" Swofford, the singer toured hundreds of college campuses in the eastern and southern United States in 1976 and 1977. He was recorded on numerous albums of his friends including Steve Goodman and is credited with guitar, and vocals on several of Steve's albums. He and Goodman wrote one of the songs together (Jessie's Jig (Rob's Romp, Beth's Bounce)) which was released on the album Jessie's Jig and Other Favorites and dedicated it to their children. His natural talent and vocal range made him one who was called often for recording sessions.

In 1984, Oliver recorded his final album In Our Time. The album was finally released in 2005 under the title Lonely Days, and contained the same song list as “In Our Time”, minus his re-recorded hits, "Good Morning Starshine" and "Jean".

Personal life and death
For a number of years in the mid-1990s, Oliver was treated for Sjögren syndrome, before being diagnosed with Non-Hodgkin lymphoma. By the time that disease was confirmed, it had spread throughout his body, giving little hope of a full remission. In 1999, his brother John donated bone marrow for a transplant to try to save Bill's life. However, he died ten months later on February 12, 2000, at LSU Hospital in Shreveport. Swofford is buried at Laurel Land Memorial Park in Dallas, Texas.

In 2009, Ted Brown, a native of Swofford's home town, asked North Carolina legislators to introduce a resolution in the North Carolina General Assembly to honor Swofford and his contributions to music. On July 7, 2009, the resolution was passed. On the 40th anniversary of Swofford's hit-making success, Brown chaired and directed a musical tribute, "OliverFest" in honor of Swofford. Bob Crewe, and "60's on 6" celebrity disc jockey, Phlash Phelps, served as honorary co-chair(s) with Brown.

Oliver was inducted into the North Carolina Music Hall of Fame in 2010. In 2012, Oliver was inducted into the Blue Ridge Music Hall of Fame. Four years later, he was inducted into the Wilkes County (North Carolina) Hall of Fame.

Discography

Albums

Singles

Bibliography
 Hyatt, Wesley (1999). The Billboard Book of #1 Adult Contemporary Hits (Billboard Publications)

References

External links

 

1945 births
2000 deaths
People from North Wilkesboro, North Carolina
Jubilee Records artists
University of North Carolina at Chapel Hill alumni
Deaths from cancer in Louisiana
Deaths from non-Hodgkin lymphoma
Musicians from North Carolina
20th-century American musicians